The 1968 French Open was a tennis tournament that took place on the outdoor clay courts at the Stade Roland Garros in Paris, France. The tournament was held from Monday 27 May until Sunday 9 June 1968. It was the 72nd edition of the French Open, the 38th to be open to foreign competitors, and the second Grand Slam of the year.

This was the first Grand Slam that allowed professional players to compete and the first Grand Slam tournament in the Open Era. Ken Rosewall and Nancy Richey won the singles titles.

The 72nd staging of the tournament went ahead, despite the French General Strike of 1968 which began on 2 May of that year.

Finals

Seniors

Men's singles

 Ken Rosewall defeated  Rod Laver, 6–3, 6–1, 2–6, 6–2  
 It was Rosewall's 5th career Grand Slam title and his 2nd French Open title.

Women's singles

 Nancy Richey defeated  Ann Haydon-Jones, 5–7, 6–4, 6–1  
 It was Richey's 2nd and last career Grand Slam title and her only French Open title.

Men's doubles

 Ken Rosewall /  Fred Stolle defeated  Roy Emerson /  Rod Laver, 6–3, 6–4, 6–3 
 It was Rosewall's 12th career Grand Slam title and his 4th and last French Open title. It was Stolle's 14th career Grand Slam title and his 3rd and last French Open title.

Women's doubles

 Françoise Dürr /  Ann Haydon-Jones defeated  Rosemary Casals /  Billie Jean King, 7–5, 4–6, 6–4 
 It was Dürr's 3rd career Grand Slam title and her 3rd French Open title. It was Haydon-Jones' 4th career Grand Slam title and her 4th French Open title.

Mixed doubles

 Françoise Dürr /  Jean-Claude Barclay defeated  Billie Jean King /  Owen Davidson, 6–1, 6–4 
 It was Durr's 4th career Grand Slam title and her 4th French Open title. It was Barclay's 1st career Grand Slam title and his 1st French Open title.

Juniors

Boys' singles
 Phil Dent defeated  John Alexander, 6–3, 3–6, 7–5

Girls' singles
 Lesley Hunt defeated  Eugenia Isopaitis, 6–4, 6–2

References

External links
 French Open official website

 
1968 in Paris
1968 in French tennis